Salvia libanensis is a perennial shrub that is endemic to the northwestern slopes of the Sierra Nevada de Santa Marta in Colombia, growing at elevations between . The inflorescence is of terminal racemes, with a  red corolla.

Notes

libanensis
Endemic flora of Colombia